Chulucanas District is one of ten districts of the province Morropón in Peru.  Its administrative headquarters is in the town of Chulucanas.

References

External links
 Municipal web site